This is a season-by-season list of records compiled by Mercyhurst in men's ice hockey.

Mercyhurst University has made three appearances in the NCAA Tournament, losing each game it has participated in. The Lakers have also played in two Division II finals but lost all four games they played.

Season-by-season results

Note: GP = Games played, W = Wins, L = Losses, T = Ties

* Winning percentage is used when conference schedules are unbalanced.

Footnotes

References

 
Mercyhurst
Mercyhurst Lakers ice hockey seasons